A log bridge is a timber bridge that uses logs that fall naturally or are intentionally felled or placed across streams. The first man-made bridges with significant span were probably intentionally felled trees. 

The use of emplaced logs is now sometimes used in temporary bridges used for logging roads, where a forest tract is to be harvested and the road then abandoned. Such log bridges have a severely limited lifetime due to soil contact and subsequent rot and wood-eating insect infestation. 

Longer lasting log bridges may be constructed by using treated logs and/or by providing well drained footings of stone or concrete combined with regular maintenance to prevent soil infiltration. This care in construction can be seen in the French bridge illustrated below, which has well locked dry set stone abutments and a footpath leveled with boards.

Various log bridge designs

External links

References

Bridges by structural type
Beam bridges
Footbridges